is a Japanese Nippon Professional Baseball player with the Yomiuri Giants in Japan's Central League.

His wife is Japanese talent artist Becky.

References

External links

1983 births
2009 World Baseball Classic players
Baseball people from Chiba Prefecture
Japanese baseball players
Living people
Nippon Professional Baseball infielders
People from Chiba (city)
Saitama Seibu Lions players
Seibu Lions players
Yomiuri Giants players
Japanese baseball coaches
Nippon Professional Baseball coaches